Ikot Onwon Ediene is a village in Ediene Usung Itu in the Ikono local government area of Akwa Ibom State in southern Nigeria.

It is bordered on the north by the local government areas of: Nkwot Ikot Nkwo, on the south by Ikot Antem Ediene, on the east by Ibakachi Ukpom, and on the west by Obio Ediene.

History 
Before the Nigerian Civil War the village was called Udung Ikot but was later renamed Ikot Onwon.

Economy 
Ikot onwon is mainly a subsistence agriculture community, mainly producing oil palm product.  70% of her annual human per capital exclusively depends on oil palm.

References

Populated places in Akwa Ibom State